The Ministry of Health of the Republic of Bashkortostan is an agency of the government of Bashkortostan, headquartered in Governor's House, Ufa.

Ministers 
After the 2018 Head of the Ministry of Health has been Mikhail Zabelin.

References

External links
Ministry of Health (Bashkortostan)
 

Politics of Bashkortostan
Bashkortostan
Government ministries of Bashkortostan
Bashkortostan
Indigenous health